Meringopus is a genus of wasps belonging to the family Ichneumonidae.

Species
Species within this genus include:

 Meringopus armatus
 Meringopus asymmetricus
 Meringopus attentorius
 Meringopus calescens
 Meringopus coronadoae
 Meringopus cyanator
 Meringopus dirus
 Meringopus eurinus
 Meringopus fasciatus
 Meringopus genatus
 Meringopus melanator
 Meringopus naitor
 Meringopus nigerrimus
 Meringopus nursei
 Meringopus pacificus
 Meringopus palmipes
 Meringopus pamirensis
 Meringopus persicator
 Meringopus pilosus
 Meringopus pseudonymus
 Meringopus punicus
 Meringopus relativus
 Meringopus reverendus
 Meringopus serraticaudus
 Meringopus sogdianus
 Meringopus sovinskii
 Meringopus suspicabilis
 Meringopus symmetricus
 Meringopus tejonensis
 Meringopus titillator
 Meringopus turanus
 Meringopus vancouverensis

References

Ichneumonidae genera